ActivityPub is an open, decentralized social networking protocol based on Pump.io's ActivityPump protocol. It provides a client/server API for creating, updating, and deleting content, as well as a federated server-to-server API for delivering notifications and content.

Project status 

ActivityPub is a standard for the Internet in the Social Web Networking Group of the World Wide Web Consortium (W3C). The standard was co-authored by Evan Prodromou, creator of StatusNet (now known as GNU social).  At an earlier stage, the name of the protocol was "ActivityPump", but it was felt that ActivityPub better indicated the cross-publishing purpose of the protocol. It learned from the experiences with the older standard called OStatus. It is the most widely supported standard (by some margin) in the Fediverse.

In January 2018, the World Wide Web Consortium (W3C) published the ActivityPub standard as a Recommendation. Lead author Christine Lemmer-Webber notes that the team predominantly identified as queer, which led to features that help users and administrators protect against "undesired interaction." She also notes that the team authoring ActivityPub had no corporate participation.

The W3C Social Community Group organizes a yearly free conference called ActivityPub Conf about the future of ActivityPub.

Former Diaspora community manager Sean Tilley wrote an article that suggests ActivityPub protocols may eventually provide a way to federate Internet platforms.

Notable implementations

Federated (server-to-server) protocol 

 Friendica, a piece of social networking software, implemented ActivityPub in version 2019.01.
 Libervia (in beta )
 Mastodon, a social networking software, implemented ActivityPub in version 1.6, released in September 2017. It is intended that ActivityPub offers more security for private messages than the previous OStatus protocol does.
 Micro.blog, a microblogging social network, added support for ActivityPub in 2018 and enabled by default for new users in October 2022.
 Nextcloud, a federated service for file hosting.
 PeerTube, a federated service for video streaming.
 Pixelfed, a piece of social networking software which resembles Instagram, is a software service implementing ActivityPub. 
 Pleroma, a lightweight fediverse server that implements ActivityPub as of its first release.
 In November 2022, Tumblr announced that they will be adding support.

See also 

 Activity Streams
 Comparison of software and protocols for distributed social networking
 Comparison of microblogging services
 Fediverse
 Micropub

References 

2018 introductions
Distributed computing
Microblogging software
Social software
Fediverse
Web applications